Veitchia pachyclada is a plant species in the palm family.

It is found only in Solomon Islands. It is threatened by habitat loss.

References

pachyclada
Trees of the Solomon Islands
Endemic flora of the Solomon Islands
Data deficient plants
Taxa named by Max Burret